5H or 5h may refer to:

 Fifth Harmony, the American girl group
 5H, a type of lead in a pencil
 SSH 5H (WA), alternate designation for Washington State Route 507
 Fly540 (IATA code)
 5H, a highly unstable isotope of hydrogen
 City of Death (production code: 5H), a 1979 Doctor Who serial

See also
 H5 (disambiguation)